Alice O'Connor (born Alisa Zinovyevna Rosenbaum; , 1905 – March 6, 1982), better known by her pen name Ayn Rand, was a Russian-born American writer and philosopher. She is known for her fiction and for developing a philosophical system she named Objectivism. Born and educated in Russia, she moved to the United States in 1926. After two early novels that were initially unsuccessful and two Broadway plays, she achieved fame with her 1943 novel, The Fountainhead. In 1957, Rand published her best-selling work, the novel Atlas Shrugged. Afterward, until her death in 1982, she turned to non-fiction to promote her philosophy, publishing her own periodicals and releasing several collections of essays.

Rand advocated reason as the only means of acquiring knowledge; she rejected faith and religion. She supported rational and ethical egoism as opposed to altruism. In politics, she condemned the initiation of force as immoral and opposed collectivism, statism, and anarchism. Instead, she supported laissez-faire capitalism, which she defined as the system based on recognizing individual rights, including private property rights. Although Rand opposed libertarianism, which she viewed as anarchism, she is often associated with the modern libertarian movement in the United States. In art, Rand promoted romantic realism. She was sharply critical of most philosophers and philosophical traditions known to her, except for Aristotle, Thomas Aquinas, and classical liberals.

Rand's books have sold over 37 million copies. Her fiction received mixed reviews from literary critics, with reviews becoming more negative for her later work. Although academic interest in her ideas has grown since her death, academic philosophers have generally ignored or rejected her philosophy because of her polemical approach and lack of methodological rigor. Her writings have politically influenced some right-libertarians and conservatives. The Objectivist movement circulates her ideas, both to the public and in academic settings.

Life

Early life
Rand was born Alisa Zinovyevna Rosenbaum on February 2, 1905, to a Russian-Jewish bourgeois family living in Saint Petersburg. She was the eldest of three daughters of Zinovy Zakharovich Rosenbaum, a pharmacist, and Anna Borisovna. She was twelve when the October Revolution and the rule of the Bolsheviks under Vladimir Lenin disrupted the life the family had enjoyed previously. Her father's business was seized, and the family fled to the city of Yevpatoria in Crimea, which was initially under the control of the White Army during the Russian Civil War. After graduating high school there in June 1921, she returned with her family to Petrograd (as Saint Petersburg was then named), where they faced desperate conditions, occasionally nearly starving.

When Russian universities were opened to women after the revolution, Rand was among the first to enroll at Petrograd State University. At 16, she began her studies in the department of social pedagogy, majoring in history. Along with many other bourgeois students, she was purged from the university shortly before graduating. After complaints from a group of visiting foreign scientists, many of the purged students were reinstated in the university. Rand was among these reinstated students and she completed her studies at the renamed Leningrad State University in October 1924. She then studied for a year at the State Technicum for Screen Arts in Leningrad. For an assignment, Rand wrote an essay about the Polish actress Pola Negri; it became her first published work. By this time, she had decided her professional surname for writing would be Rand, and she adopted the first name Ayn (pronounced ).

In late 1925, Rand was granted a visa to visit relatives in Chicago. She departed on January 17, 1926, and arrived in New York City on February 19, 1926. Intent on staying in the United States to become a screenwriter, she lived for a few months with her relatives learning English before leaving for Hollywood, California.

In Hollywood, a chance meeting with famed director Cecil B. DeMille led to work as an extra in his film The King of Kings and a subsequent job as a junior screenwriter. While working on The King of Kings, she met an aspiring young actor, Frank O'Connor; the two married on April 15, 1929. She became a permanent American resident in July 1929 and an American citizen on March 3, 1931. She made several attempts to bring her parents and sisters to the United States, but they were unable to obtain permission to emigrate.

Early fiction

Rand's first literary success came with the sale of her screenplay Red Pawn to Universal Studios in 1932, although it was never produced. Her courtroom drama Night of January 16th, first staged in Hollywood in 1934, reopened successfully on Broadway in 1935. Each night, a jury was selected from members of the audience; based on its vote, one of two different endings would be performed. Rand and O'Connor moved to New York City in December 1934 so she could handle revisions for the Broadway production.

Her first novel, the semi-autobiographical We the Living, was published in 1936. Set in Soviet Russia, it focused on the struggle between the individual and the state. Initial sales were slow, and the American publisher let it go out of print, although European editions continued to sell. She adapted the story as a stage play, but the Broadway production was a failure and closed in less than a week. After the success of her later novels, Rand was able to release a revised version in 1959 that has since sold over three million copies.

Rand started her next major novel, The Fountainhead, in December 1935, but took a break from it in 1937 to write her novella Anthem. The novella presents a vision of a dystopian future world in which totalitarian collectivism has triumphed to such an extent that the word I has been forgotten and replaced with we. It was published in England in 1938, but Rand could not find an American publisher at that time. As with We the Living, Rand's later success allowed her to get a revised version published in 1946, and this sold over 3.5 million copies.

The Fountainhead and political activism

During the 1940s, Rand became politically active. She and her husband were full-time volunteers for Republican Wendell Willkie's 1940 presidential campaign. This work brought her into contact with other intellectuals sympathetic to free-market capitalism. She became friends with journalist Henry Hazlitt, who introduced her to the Austrian School economist Ludwig von Mises. Despite philosophical differences with them, Rand strongly endorsed the writings of both men throughout her career, and they expressed admiration for her. Mises once referred to her as "the most courageous man in America", a compliment that particularly pleased her because he said "man" instead of "woman". Rand became friends with libertarian writer Isabel Paterson. Rand questioned her about American history and politics long into the night during their many meetings, and gave Paterson ideas for her only non-fiction book, The God of the Machine.

Rand's first major success as a writer came in 1943 with The Fountainhead, a novel about an uncompromising young architect named Howard Roark and his struggle against what Rand described as "second-handers"—those who attempt to live through others, placing others above themselves. Twelve publishers rejected it before Bobbs-Merrill Company accepted it at the insistence of editor Archibald Ogden, who threatened to quit if his employer did not publish it. While completing the novel, Rand was prescribed the amphetamine Benzedrine to fight fatigue. The drug helped her to work long hours to meet her deadline for delivering the novel, but afterwards she was so exhausted that her doctor ordered two weeks' rest. Her use of the drug for approximately three decades may have contributed to mood swings and outbursts described by some of her later associates.

The success of The Fountainhead brought Rand fame and financial security. In 1943, she sold the film rights to Warner Bros. and returned to Hollywood to write the screenplay. Producer Hal B. Wallis hired her afterwards as a screenwriter and script-doctor. Her work for him included the screenplays for Love Letters and You Came Along. Her contract with Wallis also allowed time for other projects, including a never-completed nonfiction treatment of her philosophy to be called The Moral Basis of Individualism.

While working in Hollywood, Rand became involved with the anti-Communist Motion Picture Alliance for the Preservation of American Ideals and wrote articles on the group's behalf. She also joined the anti-Communist American Writers Association. In 1947, during the Second Red Scare, Rand testified as a "friendly witness" before the United States House Un-American Activities Committee that the 1944 film Song of Russia grossly misrepresented conditions in the Soviet Union, portraying life there as much better and happier than it was. She also wanted to criticize the lauded 1946 film The Best Years of Our Lives for what she interpreted as its negative presentation of the business world, but was not allowed to do so. When asked after the hearings about her feelings on the investigations' effectiveness, Rand described the process as "futile".

After several delays, the film version of The Fountainhead was released in 1949. Although it used Rand's screenplay with minimal alterations, she "disliked the movie from beginning to end" and complained about its editing, the acting and other elements.

Atlas Shrugged and Objectivism

Following the publication of The Fountainhead, Rand received many letters from readers, some of whom the book had influenced profoundly. In 1951, Rand moved from Los Angeles to New York City, where she gathered a group of these admirers that included future chair of the Federal Reserve Alan Greenspan, a young psychology student named Nathan Blumenthal (later Nathaniel Branden) and his wife Barbara, and Barbara's cousin Leonard Peikoff. Initially, the group was an informal gathering of friends who met with Rand at her apartment on weekends to discuss philosophy. Later, Rand began allowing them to read the manuscript drafts of her new novel, Atlas Shrugged. In 1954, her close relationship with Nathaniel Branden turned into a romantic affair, with the knowledge of their spouses.

Published in 1957, Atlas Shrugged is considered Rand's magnum opus. She described the novel's theme as "the role of the mind in man's existence—and, as a corollary, the demonstration of a new moral philosophy: the morality of rational self-interest". It advocates the core tenets of Rand's philosophy of Objectivism and expresses her concept of human achievement. The plot involves a dystopian United States in which the most creative industrialists, scientists, and artists respond to a welfare state government by going on strike and retreating to a hidden valley where they build an independent free economy. The novel's hero and leader of the strike, John Galt, describes it as stopping "the motor of the world" by withdrawing the minds of the individuals contributing most to the nation's wealth and achievements. The novel contains an exposition of Objectivism in a lengthy monologue delivered by Galt.

Despite many negative reviews, Atlas Shrugged became an international bestseller, but the reaction of intellectuals to the novel discouraged and depressed Rand. Atlas Shrugged was her last completed work of fiction, marking the end of her career as a novelist and the beginning of her role as a popular philosopher.

In 1958, Nathaniel Branden established the Nathaniel Branden Lectures, later incorporated as the Nathaniel Branden Institute (NBI), to promote Rand's philosophy through public lectures. He and Rand co-founded The Objectivist Newsletter (later renamed The Objectivist) in 1962 to circulate articles about her ideas; she later republished some of these articles in book form. Rand was unimpressed by many of the NBI students and held them to strict standards, sometimes reacting coldly or angrily to those who disagreed with her. Critics, including some former NBI students and Branden himself, later described the culture of the NBI as one of intellectual conformity and excessive reverence for Rand. Some described the NBI or the Objectivist movement as a cult or religion. Rand expressed opinions on a wide range of topics, from literature and music to sexuality and facial hair. Some of her followers mimicked her preferences, wearing clothes to match characters from her novels and buying furniture like hers. Some former NBI students believed the extent of these behaviors was exaggerated, and the problem was concentrated among Rand's closest followers in New York.

Later years
Throughout the 1960s and 1970s, Rand developed and promoted her Objectivist philosophy through her nonfiction works and by giving talks to students at colleges and universities. She began delivering annual lectures at the Ford Hall Forum, responding to questions from the audience. During these appearances, she often took controversial stances on the political and social issues of the day. These included: supporting abortion rights, opposing the Vietnam War and the military draft (but condemning many draft dodgers as "bums"), supporting Israel in the Yom Kippur War of 1973 against a coalition of Arab nations as "civilized men fighting savages", claiming European colonists had the right to invade and take land inhabited by American Indians, and calling homosexuality "immoral" and "disgusting", despite advocating the repeal of all laws concerning it. She endorsed several Republican candidates for president of the United States, most strongly Barry Goldwater in 1964, whose candidacy she promoted in several articles for The Objectivist Newsletter.

In 1964, Nathaniel Branden began an affair with the young actress Patrecia Scott, whom he later married. Nathaniel and Barbara Branden kept the affair hidden from Rand. When she learned of it in 1968, though her romantic involvement with Branden was already over, Rand ended her relationship with both Brandens, and the NBI was closed. She published an article in The Objectivist repudiating Nathaniel Branden for dishonesty and other "irrational behavior in his private life". In subsequent years, Rand and several more of her closest associates parted company.

Rand underwent surgery for lung cancer in 1974 after decades of heavy smoking. In 1976, she retired from writing her newsletter and, after her initial objections, allowed a social worker employed by her attorney to enroll her in Social Security and Medicare. During the late 1970s, her activities within the Objectivist movement declined, especially after the death of her husband on November 9, 1979. One of her final projects was work on a never-completed television adaptation of Atlas Shrugged.

On March 6, 1982, Rand died of heart failure at her home in New York City. At her funeral, a  floral arrangement in the shape of a dollar sign was placed near her casket. In her will, Rand named Peikoff as her heir.

Literary approach and influences
Rand described her approach to literature as "romantic realism". She wanted her fiction to present the world "as it could be and should be", rather than as it was. This approach led her to create highly stylized situations and characters. Her fiction typically has protagonists who are heroic individualists, depicted as fit and attractive. Her villains support duty and collectivist moral ideals. Rand often describes them as unattractive, and some have names that suggest negative traits, such as Wesley Mouch in Atlas Shrugged.

Rand considered plot a critical element of literature, and her stories typically have what biographer Anne Heller described as "tight, elaborate, fast-paced plotting". Romantic triangles are a common plot element in Rand's fiction; in most of her novels and plays, the main female character is romantically involved with at least two men.

Influences

In school Rand read works by Fyodor Dostoevsky, Victor Hugo, Edmond Rostand, and Friedrich Schiller, who became her favorites. She considered them to be among the "top rank" of Romantic writers because of their focus on moral themes and their skill at constructing plots. Hugo was an important influence on her writing, especially her approach to plotting. In the introduction she wrote for an English-language edition of his novel Ninety-Three, Rand called him "the greatest novelist in world literature".

Although Rand disliked most Russian literature, her depictions of her heroes show the influence of the Russian Symbolists and other nineteenth-century Russian writing, most notably the 1863 novel What Is to Be Done? by Nikolay Chernyshevsky. Rand's experience of the Russian Revolution and early Communist Russia influenced the portrayal of her villains. Beyond We the Living, which is set in Russia, this influence can be seen in the ideas and rhetoric of Ellsworth Toohey in The Fountainhead, and in the destruction of the economy in Atlas Shrugged.

Rand's descriptive style echoes her early career writing scenarios and scripts for movies; her novels have many narrative descriptions that resemble early Hollywood movie scenarios. They often follow common film editing conventions, such as having a broad establishing shot description of a scene followed by close-up details, and her descriptions of women characters often take a "male gaze" perspective.

Philosophy

Rand called her philosophy "Objectivism", describing its essence as "the concept of man as a heroic being, with his own happiness as the moral purpose of his life, with productive achievement as his noblest activity, and reason as his only absolute". She considered Objectivism a systematic philosophy and laid out positions on metaphysics, aesthetics, epistemology, ethics, and political philosophy.

Metaphysics and epistemology
In metaphysics, Rand supported philosophical realism and opposed anything she regarded as mysticism or supernaturalism, including all forms of religion. Rand believed in free will as a form of agent causation and rejected determinism.

In aesthetics, Rand defined art as a "selective re-creation of reality according to an artist's metaphysical value-judgments". According to her, art allows philosophical concepts to be presented in a concrete form that can be grasped easily, thereby fulfilling a need of human consciousness. As a writer, the art form Rand focused on most closely was literature. She considered romanticism to be the approach that most accurately reflected the existence of human free will.

In epistemology, Rand considered all knowledge to be based on sense perception, the validity of which she considered axiomatic, and reason, which she described as "the faculty that identifies and integrates the material provided by man's senses". Rand rejected all claims of non-perceptual knowledge, including instinct,' 'intuition,' 'revelation,' or any form of 'just knowing. In her Introduction to Objectivist Epistemology, Rand presented a theory of concept formation and rejected the analytic–synthetic dichotomy. She believed epistemology was a foundational branch of philosophy and considered the advocacy of reason to be the single most significant aspect of her philosophy.

Commentators, including Hazel Barnes, Nathaniel Branden, and Albert Ellis, have criticized Rand's focus on the importance of reason. Barnes and Ellis said Rand was too dismissive of emotion and failed to recognize its importance in human life. Branden said Rand's emphasis on reason led her to denigrate emotions and create unrealistic expectations of how consistently rational human beings should be.

Ethics and politics
In ethics, Rand argued for rational and ethical egoism (rational self-interest), as the guiding moral principle. She said the individual should "exist for his own sake, neither sacrificing himself to others nor sacrificing others to himself". Rand referred to egoism as "the virtue of selfishness" in her book of that title. In it, she presented her solution to the is–ought problem by describing a meta-ethical theory that based morality in the needs of "man's survival qua man". She condemned ethical altruism as incompatible with the requirements of human life and happiness, and held the initiation of force was evil and irrational, writing in Atlas Shrugged that, "Force and mind are opposites".

Rand's ethics and politics are the most criticized areas of her philosophy. Several authors, including Robert Nozick and William F. O'Neill in two of the earliest academic critiques of her ideas, said she failed in her attempt to solve the is–ought problem. Critics have called her definitions of egoism and altruism biased and inconsistent with normal usage. Critics from religious traditions oppose her atheism and her rejection of altruism.

Rand's political philosophy emphasized individual rights, including property rights. She considered laissez-faire capitalism the only moral social system because in her view it was the only system based on protecting those rights. Rand opposed collectivism and statism, which she considered to include many specific forms of government, such as communism, fascism, socialism, theocracy, and the welfare state. Her preferred form of government was a constitutional republic that is limited to the protection of individual rights. Although her political views are often classified as conservative or libertarian, Rand preferred the term "radical for capitalism". She worked with conservatives on political projects, but disagreed with them over issues such as religion and ethics. Rand denounced libertarianism, which she associated with anarchism. She rejected anarchism as a naive theory based in subjectivism that would lead to collectivism in practice.

Several critics, including Nozick, have said her attempt to justify individual rights based on egoism fails. Others, like libertarian philosopher Michael Huemer, have gone further, saying that her support of egoism and her support of individual rights are inconsistent positions. Some critics, like Roy Childs, have said that her opposition to the initiation of force should lead to support of anarchism, rather than limited government.

Relationship to other philosophers

Except for Aristotle, Thomas Aquinas and classical liberals, Rand was sharply critical of most philosophers and philosophical traditions known to her. Acknowledging Aristotle as her greatest influence, Rand remarked that in the history of philosophy she could only recommend "three A's"—Aristotle, Aquinas, and Ayn Rand. In a 1959 interview with Mike Wallace, when asked where her philosophy came from, she responded: "Out of my own mind, with the sole acknowledgement of a debt to Aristotle, the only philosopher who ever influenced me."

In an article for the Claremont Review of Books, political scientist Charles Murray criticized Rand's claim that her only "philosophical debt" was to Aristotle. He asserted her ideas were derivative of previous thinkers such as John Locke and Friedrich Nietzsche. Rand took early inspiration from Nietzsche, and scholars have found indications of this in Rand's private journals. In 1928, she alluded to his idea of the "superman" in notes for an unwritten novel whose protagonist was inspired by the murderer William Edward Hickman. There are other indications of Nietzsche's influence in passages from the first edition of We the Living (which Rand later revised), and in her overall writing style. By the time she wrote The Fountainhead, Rand had turned against Nietzsche's ideas, and the extent of his influence on her even during her early years is disputed.

Rand considered her philosophical opposite to be Immanuel Kant, whom she referred to as "the most evil man in mankind's history"; she believed his epistemology undermined reason and his ethics opposed self-interest. Philosophers George Walsh and Fred Seddon have argued she misinterpreted Kant and exaggerated their differences. She was also critical of Plato, and viewed his differences with Aristotle on questions of metaphysics and epistemology as the primary conflict in the history of philosophy.

Rand's relationship with contemporary philosophers was mostly antagonistic. She was not an academic and did not participate in academic discourse. She was dismissive of critics and wrote about ideas she disagreed with in a polemical manner without in-depth analysis. She was in turn viewed very negatively by many academic philosophers, who dismissed her as an unimportant figure who need not be given serious consideration.

Reception and legacy

Critical reception

The first reviews Rand received were for Night of January 16th. Reviews of the Broadway production were largely positive, but Rand considered even positive reviews to be embarrassing because of significant changes made to her script by the producer. Although Rand believed that her novel We the Living was not widely reviewed, over 200 publications published approximately 125 different reviews. Overall, they were more positive than those she received for her later work. Her novella Anthem received little review attention, both for its first publication in England and for subsequent re-issues.

Rand's first bestseller, The Fountainhead, received far fewer reviews than We the Living, and reviewers' opinions were mixed. Lorine Pruette's positive review in The New York Times, which called the author "a writer of great power" who wrote "brilliantly, beautifully and bitterly", was one that Rand greatly appreciated. There were other positive reviews, but Rand dismissed most of them for either misunderstanding her message or for being in unimportant publications. Some negative reviews said the novel was too long; others called the characters unsympathetic and Rand's style "offensively pedestrian".

Atlas Shrugged was widely reviewed, and many of the reviews were strongly negative. Atlas Shrugged received positive reviews from a few publications, but Rand scholar Mimi Reisel Gladstein later wrote that "reviewers seemed to vie with each other in a contest to devise the cleverest put-downs", with reviews including comments that it was "written out of hate" and showed "remorseless hectoring and prolixity". Whittaker Chambers wrote what was later called the novel's most "notorious" review for the conservative magazine National Review. He accused Rand of supporting a godless system (which he related to that of the Soviets), claiming, "From almost any page of Atlas Shrugged, a voice can be heard ... commanding: 'To a gas chamber—go!.

Rand's nonfiction received far fewer reviews than her novels. The tenor of the criticism for her first nonfiction book, For the New Intellectual, was similar to that for Atlas Shrugged. Philosopher Sidney Hook likened her certainty to "the way philosophy is written in the Soviet Union", and author Gore Vidal called her viewpoint "nearly perfect in its immorality". These reviews set the pattern for reaction to her ideas among liberal critics. Her subsequent books got progressively less review attention.

Popular interest

With over 37 million copies sold , Rand's books continue to be read widely. A survey conducted for the Library of Congress and the Book-of-the-Month Club in 1991 asked club members to name the most influential book in their lives. Rand's Atlas Shrugged was the second most popular choice, after the Bible. Although Rand's influence has been greatest in the United States, there has been international interest in her work.

Rand's contemporary admirers included fellow novelists, like Ira Levin, Kay Nolte Smith and L. Neil Smith; she has influenced later writers like Erika Holzer, Terry Goodkind, and comic book artist Steve Ditko. Rand provided a positive view of business and subsequently many business executives and entrepreneurs have admired and promoted her work. Businessmen such as John Allison of BB&T and Ed Snider of Comcast Spectacor have funded the promotion of Rand's ideas.

Television shows, movies, and video games have referred to Rand and her works. Throughout her life she was the subject of many articles in popular magazines, as well as book-length critiques by authors such as the psychologist Albert Ellis and Trinity Foundation president John W. Robbins. Rand or characters based on her figure prominently in novels by American authors, including Kay Nolte Smith, Mary Gaitskill, Matt Ruff, and Tobias Wolff. Nick Gillespie, former editor-in-chief of Reason, remarked that, "Rand's is a tortured immortality, one in which she's as likely to be a punch line as a protagonist. Jibes at Rand as cold and inhuman run through the popular culture." Two movies have been made about Rand's life. A 1997 documentary film, Ayn Rand: A Sense of Life, was nominated for the Academy Award for Best Documentary Feature. The Passion of Ayn Rand, a 1999 television adaptation of the book of the same name, won several awards. Rand's image also appears on a 1999 U.S. postage stamp illustrated by artist Nick Gaetano.

Rand's works, most commonly Anthem or The Fountainhead, are sometimes assigned as secondary school reading. Since 2002, the Ayn Rand Institute has provided free copies of Rand's novels to teachers who promise to include the books in their curriculum. The Institute had distributed 4.5 million copies in the U.S. and Canada by the end of 2020. In 2017, Rand was added to the required reading list for the A Level Politics exam in the United Kingdom.

Political influence

Although she rejected the labels "conservative" and "libertarian", Rand has had a continuing influence on right-wing politics and libertarianism. Rand is often considered one of the three most important women (along with Rose Wilder Lane and Isabel Paterson) in the early development of modern American libertarianism. David Nolan, one founder of the Libertarian Party, said that "without Ayn Rand, the libertarian movement would not exist". In his history of that movement, journalist Brian Doherty described her as "the most influential libertarian of the twentieth century to the public at large". Political scientist Andrew Koppelman called her "the most widely read libertarian". Historian Jennifer Burns referred to her as "the ultimate gateway drug to life on the right".

The political figures who cite Rand as an influence are usually conservatives (often members of the Republican Party), despite Rand taking some atypical positions for a conservative, like being pro-choice and an atheist. She faced intense opposition from William F. Buckley Jr. and other contributors to the conservative National Review magazine, which published numerous criticisms of her writings and ideas. Nevertheless, a 1987 article in The New York Times referred to her as the Reagan administration's "novelist laureate". Republican congressmen and conservative pundits have acknowledged her influence on their lives and have recommended her novels. She has influenced some conservative politicians outside the U.S., such as Sajid Javid in the United Kingdom, Siv Jensen in Norway, and Ayelet Shaked in Israel.

The financial crisis of 2007–2008 spurred renewed interest in her works, especially Atlas Shrugged, which some saw as foreshadowing the crisis. Opinion articles compared real-world events with the novel's plot. Signs mentioning Rand and her fictional hero John Galt appeared at Tea Party protests. There was increased criticism of her ideas, especially from the political left. Critics blamed the economic crisis on her support of selfishness and free markets, particularly through her influence on Alan Greenspan. In 2015, Adam Weiner said that through Greenspan, "Rand had effectively chucked a ticking time bomb into the boiler room of the US economy". Lisa Duggan said that Rand's novels had "incalculable impact" in encouraging the spread of neoliberal political ideas. In 2021, Cass Sunstein said Rand's ideas could be seen in the tax and regulatory policies of the Trump administration, which he attributed to the "enduring influence" of Rand's fiction.

Academic reaction
During Rand's lifetime, her work received little attention from academic scholars. Since her death, interest in her work has increased gradually. In 2009, historian Jennifer Burns identified "three overlapping waves" of scholarly interest in Rand, including "an explosion of scholarship" since 2000. As of that year, few universities included Rand or Objectivism as a philosophical specialty or research area, with many literature and philosophy departments dismissing her as a pop culture phenomenon rather than a subject for serious study. From 2002 to 2012, over 60 colleges and universities accepted grants from the charitable foundation of BB&T Corporation that required teaching Rand's ideas or works; in some cases, the grants were controversial or even rejected because of the requirement to teach about Rand.

In 2020, media critic Eric Burns said that, "Rand is surely the most engaging philosopher of my lifetime", but "nobody in the academe pays any attention to her, neither as an author nor a philosopher". That same year, the editor of a collection of critical essays about Rand said academics who disapproved of her ideas had long held "a stubborn resolve to ignore or ridicule" her work, but he believed more academic critics were engaging with her work in recent years.

To her ideas

In 1967, John Hospers discussed Rand's ethical ideas in the second edition of his textbook, An Introduction to Philosophical Analysis. That same year, Hazel Barnes included a chapter critiquing Objectivism in her book An Existentialist Ethics. When the first full-length academic book about Rand's philosophy appeared in 1971, its author declared writing about Rand "a treacherous undertaking" that could lead to "guilt by association" for taking her seriously. A few articles about Rand's ideas appeared in academic journals before her death in 1982, many of them in The Personalist. One of these was "On the Randian Argument" by libertarian philosopher Robert Nozick, who criticized her meta-ethical arguments. Other philosophers, writing in the same publication, argued that Nozick misstated Rand's case. In an article responding to Nozick, Douglas Den Uyl and Douglas B. Rasmussen defended her positions, but described her style as "literary, hyperbolic and emotional".

The Philosophic Thought of Ayn Rand, a 1984 collection of essays about Objectivism edited by Den Uyl and Rasmussen, was the first academic book about Rand's ideas published after her death. In one essay, political writer Jack Wheeler wrote that despite "the incessant bombast and continuous venting of Randian rage", Rand's ethics are "a most immense achievement, the study of which is vastly more fruitful than any other in contemporary thought". In 1987, the Ayn Rand Society was founded as an affiliate of the American Philosophical Association.

In a 1995 entry about Rand in Contemporary Women Philosophers, Jenny A. Heyl described a divergence in how different academic specialties viewed Rand. She said that Rand's philosophy "is regularly omitted from academic philosophy. Yet, throughout literary academia, Ayn Rand is considered a philosopher." Writing in the 1998 edition of the Routledge Encyclopedia of Philosophy, political theorist Chandran Kukathas summarized the mainstream philosophical reception of her work in two parts. He said most commentators view her ethical argument as an unconvincing variant of Aristotle's ethics, and her political theory "is of little interest" because it is marred by an "ill-thought out and unsystematic" effort to reconcile her hostility to the state with her rejection of anarchism. The Journal of Ayn Rand Studies, a multidisciplinary, peer-reviewed academic journal devoted to the study of Rand and her ideas, was established in 1999.

In a 2010 essay for the Cato Institute, Huemer argued very few people find Rand's ideas convincing, especially her ethics. He attributed the attention she receives to her being a "compelling writer", especially as a novelist, noting that Atlas Shrugged outsells Rand's non-fiction works and the works of other philosophers of classical liberalism. In 2012, the Pennsylvania State University Press agreed to take over publication of The Journal of Ayn Rand Studies, and the University of Pittsburgh Press launched an "Ayn Rand Society Philosophical Studies" series based on the Society's proceedings. The Fall 2012 update to the entry about Rand in the Stanford Encyclopedia of Philosophy said that "only a few professional philosophers have taken her work seriously". That same year, political scientist Alan Wolfe dismissed Rand as a "nonperson" among academics, an attitude that writer Ben Murnane later described as "the traditional academic view" of Rand. Philosopher Skye C. Cleary wrote in a 2018 article for Aeon that, "Philosophers love to hate Ayn Rand. It's trendy to scoff at any mention of her." However, Cleary said that because many people take Rand's ideas seriously, philosophers "need to treat the Ayn Rand phenomenon seriously" and provide refutations rather than ignoring her.

To her fiction
Academic consideration of Rand as a literary figure during her life was even more limited than the discussion of her philosophy. Mimi Reisel Gladstein could not find any scholarly articles about Rand's novels when she began researching her in 1973, and only three such articles appeared during the rest of the 1970s. Since her death, scholars of English and American literature have continued largely to ignore her work, although attention to her literary work has increased since the 1990s. Several academic book series about important authors cover Rand and her works, as do popular study guides like CliffsNotes and SparkNotes. In The Literary Encyclopedia entry for Rand written in 2001, John David Lewis declared that "Rand wrote the most intellectually challenging fiction of her generation." In 2019, Duggan described Rand's fiction as popular and influential on many readers, despite being easy to criticize for "her cartoonish characters and melodramatic plots, her rigid moralizing, her middle- to lowbrow aesthetic preferences ... and philosophical strivings".

Objectivist movement

After the closure of the Nathaniel Branden Institute, the Objectivist movement continued in other forms. In the 1970s, Peikoff began delivering courses on Objectivism. In 1979, Peter Schwartz started a newsletter called The Intellectual Activist, which Rand endorsed. She also endorsed The Objectivist Forum, a bimonthly magazine founded by Objectivist philosopher Harry Binswanger, which ran from 1980 to 1987.

In 1985, Peikoff worked with businessman Ed Snider to establish the Ayn Rand Institute, a nonprofit organization dedicated to promoting Rand's ideas and works. In 1990, after an ideological disagreement with Peikoff, David Kelley founded the Institute for Objectivist Studies, now known as The Atlas Society. In 2001, historian John McCaskey organized the Anthem Foundation for Objectivist Scholarship, which provides grants for scholarly work on Objectivism in academia.

Selected works

Fiction and drama:
 Night of January 16th (performed 1934, published 1968)
 We the Living (1936, revised 1959)
 Anthem (1938, revised 1946)
 The Unconquered (performed 1940, published 2014)
 The Fountainhead (1943)
 Atlas Shrugged (1957)
 The Early Ayn Rand (1984)
 Ideal (2015)

Non-fiction:
 For the New Intellectual (1961)
 The Virtue of Selfishness (1964)
 Capitalism: The Unknown Ideal (1966, expanded 1967)
 The Romantic Manifesto (1969, expanded 1975)
 The New Left (1971, expanded 1975)
 Introduction to Objectivist Epistemology (1979, expanded 1990)
 Philosophy: Who Needs It (1982)
 Letters of Ayn Rand (1995)
 Journals of Ayn Rand (1997)

Notes

References

Works cited

 
 
 
 
  
 
 
 
 
 
 
 
 
 
 
 
 
 
 
 
 
 
 
 
 
 
 
 
 
 
 
 
 
  
 
 
 
 
 
 
 
 
 
 
 
 
 
 
 
 
 
 
 
 
 
 
 
 
 
 
 
 
 
 
 
 
 
 
 
  Reprinted from Esquire, July 1961.

External links

 Frequently Asked Questions About Ayn Rand from the Ayn Rand Institute
 
 
 
 Rand's papers at The Library of Congress
 Ayn Rand Lexicon – searchable database
 
 
 
 "Writings of Ayn Rand" – from C-SPAN's American Writers: A Journey Through History

 
1905 births
1982 deaths
20th-century American dramatists and playwrights
20th-century American novelists
20th-century American philosophers
20th-century American screenwriters
20th-century American women writers
20th-century atheists
20th-century essayists
20th-century pseudonymous writers
20th-century Russian philosophers
Activists from New York (state)
American abortion-rights activists
American anti-communists
American anti-fascists
American atheist writers
American essayists
American ethicists
American political activists
American political philosophers
American science fiction writers
American secularists
American women dramatists and playwrights
American women essayists
American women novelists
American women philosophers
American women screenwriters
American writers of Russian descent
Aristotelian philosophers
Atheist philosophers
Atheists from the Russian Empire
Burials at Kensico Cemetery
Critics of Christianity
Dramatists and playwrights from the Russian Empire
Epistemologists
Exophonic writers
Female critics of feminism
Metaphysicians
Novelists from New York (state)
Objectivists
People with acquired American citizenship
Philosophers from New York (state)
Political philosophers
Pseudonymous women writers
Saint Petersburg State University alumni
Screenwriters from New York (state)
Soviet emigrants to the United States
Women science fiction and fantasy writers
Writers from New York City
Writers from Saint Petersburg